Makarovo (Maqar) is a rural locality (a selo) and the administrative centre of Makarovsky Selsoviet, Ishimbaysky District, Bashkortostan, Russia. The population was 1,019 as of 2010. There are 12 streets.

Geography 
Makarovo is located 51 km northeast of Ishimbay (the district's administrative centre) by road. Ziganovka is the nearest rural locality.

References 

Rural localities in Ishimbaysky District
Ufa Governorate